Samuel E. Chapman was a member of the Wisconsin State Assembly during the 1848 and 1861 sessions. Other positions he held include justice of the peace. Originally serving as a Whig, he later became a Republican.

References

People from Racine County, Wisconsin
American justices of the peace
Wisconsin Whigs
Year of birth missing
Year of death missing
Republican Party members of the Wisconsin State Assembly